The 2004–05 NBA season was the Rockets' 38th season in the National Basketball Association, and their 34th season in the city of Houston. During the offseason, the Rockets acquired All-Star forward Tracy McGrady and Juwan Howard from the Orlando Magic, acquired All-Star center Dikembe Mutombo from the Chicago Bulls, who acquired him from the New York Knicks, and signed free agent Bob Sura. The Rockets struggled with a 6–11 start to the season, then played around .500 as they traded Jim Jackson to the New Orleans Hornets for David Wesley in late December. The Rockets would later on win eight straight games in February, as McGrady and Yao Ming were both selected to play in the 2005 NBA All-Star Game at Denver. At midseason, the team traded Maurice Taylor to the New York Knicks, and acquired Mike James from the Milwaukee Bucks.

The Rockets won their final seven games finishing third in the Southwest Division with a 51–31 record, which was their first 50-win season since 1997. However, in the first round of the playoffs, they lost to their in-state rival, the Dallas Mavericks in seven games after taking a 2–0 series lead. Following the season, Sura retired.

Offseason

NBA Draft

Roster

Regular season

Tracy McGrady: 13 points in 35 seconds

One notable game during the season was the Rockets' December 9 matchup against the San Antonio Spurs. In the fourth quarter, at 44 seconds left, the score was 76-68 and the Spurs had the lead. With 35 seconds remaining, Tracy McGrady made a three-pointer. Four seconds later, Devin Brown was fouled and made both of his free throws. With 24 seconds remaining, McGrady made another three-pointer. He was fouled by Tim Duncan when he shot the ball. He went to the free throw line and made a free throw, converting a four-point play. With 16 seconds remaining, Scott Padgett intentionally fouled Tim Duncan, and, because the Rockets were over the foul limit, Duncan went to the free throw line and made both of his free throws. Five seconds later, McGrady made yet another three-pointer, this time over Bruce Bowen. This left the Rockets in a two-point deficit. San Antonio took a timeout. At 7.9 seconds remaining, Brent Barry inbounded the ball to Devin Brown. McGrady stole the ball from Brown and ran to the three-point line, where he made another three-pointer, which would be the game-winning shot. The performance is considered by some to be one of McGrady's career highlights and become a Hall of Famer in 2017.

Season standings

Record vs. opponents

Game log

Playoffs

|- align="center" bgcolor="#ccffcc"
| 1
| April 23
| @ Dallas
| W 98–86
| Tracy McGrady (34)
| Mutombo, Yao (8)
| Tracy McGrady (8)
| American Airlines Center20,678
| 1–0
|- align="center" bgcolor="#ccffcc"
| 2
| April 25
| @ Dallas
| W 113–111
| Yao Ming (33)
| McGrady, Yao (8)
| Tracy McGrady (10)
| American Airlines Center20,884
| 2–0
|- align="center" bgcolor="#ffcccc"
| 3
| April 28
| Dallas
| L 102–106
| Tracy McGrady (28)
| Bob Sura (11)
| McGrady, Sura (6)
| Toyota Center18,199
| 2–1
|- align="center" bgcolor="#ffcccc"
| 4
| April 30
| Dallas
| L 93–97
| Tracy McGrady (36)
| Dikembe Mutombo (7)
| Tracy McGrady (5)
| Toyota Center18,211
| 2–2
|- align="center" bgcolor="#ffcccc"
| 5
| May 2
| @ Dallas
| L 100–103
| Yao Ming (30)
| Tracy McGrady (9)
| Tracy McGrady (6)
| American Airlines Center20,894
| 2–3
|- align="center" bgcolor="#ccffcc"
| 6
| May 5
| Dallas
| W 101–83
| Tracy McGrady (37)
| Dikembe Mutombo (10)
| Tracy McGrady (7)
| Toyota Center18,215
| 3–3
|- align="center" bgcolor="#ffcccc"
| 7
| May 7
| @ Dallas
| L 76–116
| Yao Ming (33)
| Yao Ming (10)
| Tracy McGrady (7)
| American Airlines Center20,884
| 3–4
|-

Player statistics

Season

Playoffs

Awards and records
Tracy McGrady, All-NBA Third Team

Transactions

References

See also
2004-05 NBA season

Houston Rockets seasons